The Church of St Margaret of Antioch is a church in Blackfordby, Leicestershire. It is a Grade II listed building.

History

Exterior
The church is built in the Decorated style. The tower has 3 stages with a broach spire, lucarnes and diagonal buttresses. The south doorway has foliage capitals. The nave has 2 single-light windows and 2 2-light windows. The chancel has a trefoil-headed south doorway, diagonal buttresses, 2 2-light south windows, 3-light East window with intersecting tracery. The vestry has 2 cusped east windows.

Interior
The nave has a 5-bay hammerbeam roof. The chancel's canted boarded ceiling is painted blue. The chancel' north arcade has an octagonal central pier and double-chamfered arches.

The font is made of Chellaston marble. There is a tablet to Edward Newcomen (died 1722) and his wife. The chancel has a fragment of medieval stained glass believed to depict St Margaret of Antioch.

References

Blackfordby
Blackfordby